Bones are rigid connective members that make up the skeleton of vertebrates.

Bones or The Bones may also refer to:

People
 Bones (nickname), a list of people
 Bones (rapper), underground rapper
 Bones (surname), a list of people
 Jon Jones or Bones (born 1987), American mixed martial artist

Arts, entertainment, and media

Fictional characters
 Bones, a minstrel show character
 Temperance "Bones" Brennan, a character on the television show Bones
 Leonard McCoy or "Bones", a character on Star Trek

Films
 Bones (2001 film), a horror film
 Bones (soundtrack)
 Bones (2010 film), a drama film

Literature
 Bones (Kellerman novel), a novel by Jonathan Kellerman
 Bones, a novel by Jan Burke
 Bones, a novella by Pat Murphy
 Bones, a novel series by Edgar Wallace

Music

Albums
 Bones (Son Lux album)
 Bones (Young Guns album)
 Bones, a 1995 album by Susan McKeown

Songs
 "Bones" (Equinox song), a 2018 song that represented Bulgaria in the Eurovision Song Contest 2018
 "Bones" (Ginny Blackmore song), 2013
 "Bones" (Editors song), 2008
 "Bones" (Imagine Dragons song), 2022
 "Bones" (The Killers song), 2006
 "Bones" (Michael Kiwanuka song), 2011
 "Bones" (Young Guns song), 2013
 "Bones" (Galantis song), 2019
 "Bones", a song by Demi Lovato from Holy Fvck, 2022
 "Bones", a song by Joe Walsh from There Goes the Neighborhood
 "Bones", a song by Radiohead from The Bends
 "Bones", a song by Rebecca Ferguson from Superwoman
 "Bones", by Telenova, 2021
 "The Bones" (song), a song by Maren Morris

Other uses in music
 Bones (band), an American power pop band
 Bones (instrument), a musical instrument

Other uses in arts, entertainment, and media
 Bones (studio), a Japanese anime studio
 Bones (TV series), an American crime show
 Bones, a slang term for objects used in gaming:
 Dice
 Dominoes

Other uses
 The Bones, a mountain peak in Ireland
 Bones (bull), #05 Professional Bull Riders World Champion bucking bull
 Bones Bearings, a brand of skateboard bearings
 "Bones", nickname of HMS Kempenfelt (I18), a Royal Navy destroyer

See also 
 Bad Bones, ring name of German professional wrestler John Klinger (born 1984)
 Bone (disambiguation)
 Boner (disambiguation)
 Mr Bones (disambiguation)